The term economic terrorism or financial terrorism is strictly defined to indicate an attempt at economic destabilization by a group.   Economic terrorism is defined in the following terms:

Impact on supply chains
Financial terrorism (also known as economic terrorism) most commonly refers to the secret manipulation of a nation's economy by state or non-state actors. However, economic terrorism may also be unconcealed, arguably in the name of economic sanctions. Economic terrorism targets civilians of nations or groups in the pursuit of political aims.

Terroristic attacks against ports and land borders cause extra measures to be implemented to ensure the safe arrival of the product. These measures force the cost of exporting and importing goods to increase. Emerging economies are the most affected, because the slowing of exports and imports will affect the country’s ability to combat poverty. An increase in poverty can cause revolts among the population and possible political destabilization, forcing an even greater increase in poverty.

To counter piracy, governments and maritime industries must take preventative measures. The United States Maritime Administration says "These actions may include a larger military presence in high-risk areas, rerouting ships to bypass the Gulf of Aden, paying higher insurance premiums, hiring private security guards, and installing non-lethal deterrent equipment." The cost of these preventative measures is passed on to consumers and tax payers, ultimately directing money away from other areas of the economy.

See also 
 Cyberwarfare
 Economic warfare
 Corporate warfare
 Destabilisation
 Sabotage
 State terrorism
 Critical infrastructure protection

References

Economic warfare
Terrorism by method

Further reading